Edward Spencer (18 June 1876 – 10 April 1931) was a Scottish rugby union international who represented Scotland in the 1898 Home Nations Championship.

He was born to parents James Spencer and Jessie Steven and had 3 brothers and 4 sisters. He grew up in Eastwood, Renfrewshire.

He played as a centre for Clydesdale RFC and also represented Glasgow District. He played in the 2 December 1899 inter-city match against Edinburgh District. Edinburgh won the match 9-3.

He played just the once for the Scottish international rugby union side, against Ireland on 18 February 1898 in Belfast. Scotland won the match 8-0; by 2 tries and a conversion.

References

1876 births
1931 deaths
Scottish rugby union players
Scotland international rugby union players
Glasgow District (rugby union) players
Clydesdale RFC Glasgow rugby union players
Rugby union players from Renfrewshire
Rugby union centres